Reticulariaceae is a family of slime molds recognized by the Integrated Taxonomic Information System and is composed of the genera Dictydiaethalium, Enteridium, Lycogala, Reticularia, and Tubifera.

However, other classifications place Dictydiaethalium in the family Dictydiaethaliaceae and the other genera above in the family Tubiferaceae.

References

Myxogastria